A list of films produced in Brazil in 1984:

See also
1984 in Brazil
1984 in Brazilian television

References

External links
Brazilian films of 1984 at the Internet Movie Database

Brazil
1984
Films